The Biosphere Reserve of Ñacuñan is located in the Mendoza Province, Argentina. It is a composed of three main geomorphological areas.

Notes

Protected areas of Mendoza Province
Biosphere reserves of Argentina
Mapuche language